The Backcountry was a region in North America. It was a frontier heavily inhabited by various Native American tribes, though a few colonists also traded and settled there. After the French and Indian War (1754-1763), Great Britain issued the Proclamation of 1763 that forced many English settlers out of the land west of the Appalachians in order to prevent future conflicts. The boundary drawn between the Thirteen Colonies and the Backcountry in the 1763 Proclamation solidified the boundary between the two regions, though many colonists ignored it in protest. When the United States gained independence from Great Britain in 1783, the Backcountry became vulnerable to its encroachment. Upon the establishment of the Northwest Territory in the Great Lakes region and claims by states such as Georgia, South Carolina, North Carolina and Virginia to the southern frontier to the east of the Mississippi River, the region became referred to as the "West". The new name was defined according to its then-current position within the American territory.

References

17th-century establishments in the Thirteen Colonies
18th-century disestablishments in the Thirteen Colonies
Historical regions in the United States